The Roman Catholic  Diocese of Córdoba in Mexico is a diocese of the Catholic Church seated in Córdoba, Veracruz. It was established on 15 April 2000. It is a suffragan diocese of the Archdiocese of Jalapa.

Bishops
Eduardo Porfirio Patiño Leal (15 April 2000 - 4 July 2020)
Eduardo Cirilo Carmona Ortega, C.O.R.C. (4 July 2020 – present)

References

External links

Cordoba (Mexico)
Cordoba, Roman Catholic Diocese of
Cordoba (Mexico)
Cordoba (Mexico)